The Premadasa cabinet was the central government of Sri Lanka led by President Ranasinghe Premadasa between 1989 and 1993. It was formed in January 1989 after the presidential election and it ended in May 1993 with Premadasa's assassination.

Cabinet members

Non-cabinet ministers

Ministers of state

District ministers

Notes

References

Cabinet of Sri Lanka
1989 establishments in Sri Lanka
1993 disestablishments in Sri Lanka
Cabinets established in 1989
Cabinets disestablished in 1993